Joanna Marsh (born 1970) is a British composer of choral and orchestral works, who has lived in Dubai since 2007.

Life and career 
Marsh studied composition with Richard Blackford and Judith Bingham. She was a student at the Royal Academy of Music between 1998 and 1999, Organ Scholar at Sidney Sussex College, Cambridge 1989-1992 and the School Organist at Christ's Hospital between 1997-2000. Marsh was later appointed Composer in Residence at Sidney Sussex College, Cambridge in 2015 for five years.  During this time she wrote five works for the college choir and the college organ all of which feature on her album Sanctifica Nos: Choral and Instrumental Music by Joanna Marsh performed by the choir of Sidney Sussex College, Fretwork and Martin Baker, organ.  Her earlier solo album, Flare released on Friday 18 September 2020, features music performed by the BBC Singers, BBC Symphony Orchestra, the Choir of Royal Holloway, University of London and the London Mozart Players.

Marsh's life in the Middle East offered many musical opportunities including writing an orchestral work to celebrate the building of the Burj Khalifa, a commission for the BBC Symphony Orchestra for the first BBC Proms in Dubai in 2017, and a fanfare for the Queen’s visit to Abu Dhabi in 2010 and musical arrangements for the Pope’s first visit to the Middle East in 2019.

Her first opera was inspired by Dubai life: My Beautiful Camel, written with librettist David Pountney, and as yet it has not been given its premiere. An early draft of Act 1 was workshopped by the National Opera Studio in 2017.

Marsh is a Co-Founder of ChoirFest Middle East in Dubai, an annual celebration of the region’s choral music scene which reached its eighth edition in March 2020.

She is the wife of the British businessman and musician, Paul Griffiths; they have one child. They commissioned the French organ builder Bernard Aubertin to install a three-manual, 30-stop pipe organ in their home in East Sussex; it is the largest classical pipe organ in a private home in the UK.

Selected works
 The Tower (2008)
 St. Paul's Service (2010)
 Thou has searched me and known me (2015)
 Flare (2017)
Pearl of Freedom (2018)
My Beautiful Camel (2019)

References

External links

Gramophone Review (October 2021)
Financial Times Profile 
CD Review (Guardian)
Sidney Sussex Choir - Composer in residence

1970 births
Living people
Alumni of the Royal Academy of Music
20th-century classical composers
21st-century classical composers
21st-century British composers
British women classical composers
20th-century English composers
20th-century English women musicians
21st-century English women musicians
Alumni of Sidney Sussex College, Cambridge
20th-century women composers
21st-century women composers